Minuscule 692 (in the Gregory-Aland numbering), ε1284 (von Soden), is a Greek minuscule manuscript of the New Testament, on parchment. Palaeographically it has been assigned to the 12th century. The manuscript is lacunose. Scrivener labelled it by 596e.

Description 

The codex contains the text of the Gospel of Matthew, Gospel of Mark, and Gospel of Luke on 237 parchment leaves (size ), with lacuna (Luke 2:7-21). The text is written in one column per page, 23 lines per page.

According to Scrivener it is "exquisitely written", with great resemble to Minuscule 71 in text. Edward A. Guy recognised this resemblance as the first.

Text 

The Greek text of the codex is a representative of the Byzantine text-type. Kurt Aland placed it in Category V.

According to the Claremont Profile Method it represents textual cluster M27.

History 

Scrivener dated the manuscript to the 14th century, Gregory dated it to the 12th or 13th century. Currently the manuscript is dated by the INTF to the 12th century.

The manuscript was bought from Spyridion Lambros from Athens in 1859, along with 22 other manuscripts of the New Testament (codices: 269, 270, 271, 272, 688, 689, 690, 691, 693, etc.).

It was added to the list of New Testament manuscript by Scrivener (596) and Gregory (692).

It was examined by S. T. Bloomfield and Dean Burgon. Gregory saw the manuscript in 1883.

The manuscript is currently housed at the British Library (Add MS 22740) in London.

See also 

 List of New Testament minuscules
 Biblical manuscript
 Textual criticism

References

Further reading 

 S. T. Bloomfield, Critical Annotations: Additional and Supplementary on the New Testament (1860).

Greek New Testament minuscules
12th-century biblical manuscripts
British Library additional manuscripts